Scooby-Doo! Night of 100 Frights is a third person platform game with action elements that was developed by Heavy Iron Studios and published by THQ for the PlayStation 2, GameCube, and Xbox. The game was released on May 22, 2002, in North America and was released later that year in PAL regions. It was the first Scooby-Doo! video game on sixth-generation consoles. The PlayStation 2 version became a Greatest Hits title in May 2003.  The game has a follow up titled Scooby-Doo! Mystery Mayhem.

The game puts players in the control of Scooby-Doo in a story that revolves around him searching for the rest of the gang around a haunted mansion after they are kidnapped by an eccentric villain. The game has twelve areas, ranging from graveyards and secret labs to fishing villages and haunted mazes.

Gameplay

Night of 100 Frights is primarily a third-person game with action elements. The player controls the title character Scooby-Doo. The primary goal of the game is to hunt for the gang after they go missing at the mysterious Mystic Manor. Scooby has several abilities in the game as well as many inventions he finds on the grounds of the mansion to aid him in his search. 

The game's combat system allows the player to run, jump, and perform attacks to fend off enemies that are encountered. Various villains from the original Scooby Doo! show are met throughout the game, as well as other minor villains like bats, rats, spiders, and crabs. Scooby's health bar goes down when a villain or enemy scares Scooby, and it can only be restored by various food items that can be obtained throughout the game. Whenever Scooby is scared by a villain, if he bashes and kills the villain instantly afterwards, a food item will be provided on the spot to get his health level back up.

Easter eggs that players can obtain, called "Monster Tokens", are large collectible tokens that have a picture of a Scooby-Doo! villain on them; when the player collects the token, the villain will be able to be viewed in a room in Mystic Manor known as the Monster Gallery, where trivia about the villain is given. Various gadgets that can aid Scooby – "inventions" created by a character in the game known as The Professor – are also scattered throughout the game's levels. Once obtained, the player can return to previous levels to explore areas that weren't accessible before. There are "warp gates", which, when activated, are machines that teleport Scooby to other activated warp gates throughout the game. The boss fights consist of major Scooby-Doo! villains, such as Redbeard or the Black Knight. Various secret passages and trap doors, which act as shortcuts, are scattered throughout the game. Outside levels also have various obstacles, such as moving platforms and mud-slides.

Scooby must also collect Scooby Snacks scattered throughout the game in order to open "Snack Gates" that open many of the game's doors; as the game progresses, the Snack Gates demand more Scooby Snacks. Although it is optional to collect all of the snacks, bonus content is unlocked if the player does so. The voice acting is complemented by sound effects taken straight from the cartoon, including a laugh track that reacts to Scooby's onscreen actions.

There are also Holiday easter eggs programmed into the game. When the game is played on certain days of the year, special decorations will appear in front of the Manor. For instance, on Christmas, it will be snowing, and on Halloween bats appear above the doors and windows. New Year's Day, Saint Patrick's Day, Valentine's Day, and the Fourth of July are other holidays that have special surprises as well.

Synopsis

Setting
In a recreation of the classic Scooby-Doo formula, a ghost/monster is terrorizing the locals of a town, with Scooby and the gang called to solve a mystery. An eccentric villain known as The Mastermind kidnaps the gang, and Scooby must venture through graveyards, lighthouses, and secret passages in an effort to solve the mystery and find his friends. The game is mainly set inside a large mansion known as Mystic Manor. The manor has dozens of rooms and floors, from the secret laboratory in the basement to the haunted attic. The game is set during the late hours of the night. Outside of the Manor, players can explore the vast graveyard section as well as the sea pier section. Each section has its own settings, such as fishing canneries and haunted crypts.

Plot
Daphne's close friend, Holly Graham, has asked the Mystery Inc. crew to help her investigate the disappearance of her uncle, Professor Alexander Graham (Tim Conway), a genius and inventor. The five arrive at the mansion, known as Mystic Manor, where they are greeted by Holly; she recounts how Daphne has told her about their past cases before inviting the group to come inside, but Scooby and Shaggy refuse. Fred, Daphne, and Velma follow Holly inside, leaving Shaggy and Scooby outside alone. When Shaggy goes to obtain a box of Scooby Snacks he notices hanging from a gnarled tree, he pulls on one of the branches and falls into a trap door. Frightened, Scooby explores the grounds and discovers a nearby playground where he collects a monster token, receives some clues for the mystery, and eats all of the Scooby snacks. He then enters the mansion and discovers Holly locked in a room. She explains that a specter called The Mastermind appeared, kidnapping Fred, Daphne, and Velma before imprisoning her, and gives him a map of the region for getting around.

Unable to navigate the rest of the mansion, Scooby returns to the front yard where he speaks with Graham's gardener (Don Knotts), who gives him a shovel. The shovel allows him to obtain a key to the nearby fishing village. Between the Fishing Village and the docks to the ocean, Scooby encounters Shaggy once again, who assists him with unlocking an entrance to the piers of the village before, again, vanishing without a trace. Soon Scooby comes to an old lighthouse, where he acquires one of Graham's inventions: a pair of springs, which allow him to double jump. Scooby uses this ability to obtain a key to the mansion's topiary garden. 

Scooby makes his way back to the mansion grounds. He navigates the topiary garden, where he obtains one of the professor's inventions: a helmet, allowing him to destroy attacking monsters and bash through cobwebs. Scooby explores the mansion, making his way through numerous rooms, the library, and the attic, before arriving at the top of a tower. He meets The Mastermind, who reveals that he is responsible for resurrecting the monsters and ghosts the group has unmasked, before revealing Velma trapped in a cage, which is guarded by the Black Knight, the first monster Scooby ever encountered. Scooby is able to destroy him by pressing switches which electrocute him, before freeing Velma from her cage. She flees in terror, claiming to see the Creeper. Scooby does not follow her as he does not see the Creeper anywhere in sight.

Following this, Scooby explores a local cannery, along with the overhangs and some interconnected tunnels under the mansion, which lead him to a nearby cemetery. He rescues Shaggy from some monsters, before discovering Daphne held hostage by The Mastermind. The Mastermind proceeds to summon the Green Ghost, which attacks Scooby with green fire and electricity. Scooby is able to contain the Green Ghost with Daphne's help. Suddenly, Holly emerges from the brush. She and Daphne fall through a concealed door when Daphne rests against a tombstone, leaving Scooby alone once again. He uses a newly acquired invention, an umbrella, to explore a chain of old shipwrecks. Eventually, Scooby discovers Fred imprisoned in one of the ship's brigs, where he is confronted by The Ghost of Redbeard. He attacks Scooby by summoning numerous ghosts, but Scooby is able to smash him by dropping a treasure chest on his head. Velma arrives, still claiming to be chased by the Creeper. Fred discovers an image of the monster stamped on her glasses, and they head off to search for Graham's concealed laboratory. Meanwhile, Scooby and Shaggy indulge themselves with food, but Shaggy is scared off by The Ghost of Captain Cutler. Scooby acquires another of Graham's inventions: bubblegum, which he uses to trap monsters from being able to attack him.

Scooby makes his way back to the overhangs, where he begins navigating the dungeons under the mansion. He encounters numerous ghosts, which he is able to destroy and avoid using his newly acquired inventions: air-bubbles. Scooby eventually discovers Professor Graham's laboratory, which has become overrun with monsters, namely the Funland Robot and the Space Kook. Scooby rescues Shaggy from being eaten by a shark, before continuing onward into another room, where he reunites with the rest of the gang and Holly. Fred reveals that the ghosts are entirely fake: The Mastermind has been using holographic images of monsters and ghosts from their past to terrorize them. He constructs a plan, which calls for Scooby to distract The Mastermind. Scooby fights and defeats The Mastermind, stunning him. He is sucked up through a tube which spits him out in the mansion's parlor.

The gang and Holly make their way back to the first floor of the mansion. They unmask The Mastermind, only to discover Professor Graham in the costume. Velma argues that none of the clues make sense, before holding her glasses up to a mirror. The light reflected off the glasses and mirror reveal Holly operating a control panel behind a holographic wall. They realize the Holly they have been with the entire time has been a hologram when Shaggy attempts to touch her shoulder, but instead falls through her. Holly was able to escape the mansion and swap costumes with an incapacitated Professor Graham, making him look guilty. She was able to reconstruct images of the monsters, due to Daphne previously revealing details about the cases the gang had worked in the past. Holly admits to the scheme as a way of enabling her to take commendation for Graham's new invention and make money off of it, before she is sent to jail. Shaggy attempts to eat some food, only to discover it is a holographic image made by Scooby before saying "Scooby-Dooby-Doo!"

Development and release 

Initially planned for a June 2002 release, the game was released on May 22, 2002 initially for the PlayStation 2 (just prior to E3 2002), before being ported to other platforms later.

Reception

Night of 100 Frights was met with "mixed or average" reviews from critics. GameRankings and Metacritic gave it a score of 69.54% and 69 out of 100 for the PlayStation 2 version; 68.14% and 68 out of 100 for the GameCube version; and 70.83% and 66 out of 100 for the Xbox version.

By July 2006, the PlayStation 2 version of Night of 100 Frights had sold 920,000 copies and earned $24 million in the United States. Next Generation ranked it as the 62nd highest-selling game launched for the PlayStation 2, Xbox or GameCube between January 2000 and July 2006 in that country. Combined console sales of Scooby-Doo games released in the 2000s reached 1.8 million units in the United States by July 2006.

References

External links
 

2002 video games
Detective video games
GameCube games
PlayStation 2 games
Video games based on Scooby-Doo
THQ games
Warner Bros. video games
3D platform games
Video games scored by Tommy Tallarico
Xbox games
RenderWare games
Holography in fiction
Single-player video games
Video games developed in the United States